Nahar Block consists of 46 Gram Panchayats and 49 Villages and 123303 is its pincode number.

Name of Villages & Gram Panchayats of Nahar Block
Sr. No.	Name of Village	
1	Ahamdpur Parthal- Name of Gram Panchyat- Ahamdpur Parthal (Nahar)
2	Bahala	
3	Bahrampur	
4	Bass Rattanthal	
5	Bawwa	
6	Bhakli	
7	Bharangi	
8	Bhurthala	
9	Bishoha	
10	Chhawa	
11	Dharoli	
12	Garhi	
13	Gudiani	
14	(A) Gugodh (Rewari), (B) Malesiyawas-Name of Gram Panchyat- Gugodh	
15	Gujarwas	
16	Jahidpur Tappa Kosli	
17	Jakhala	
18	(A)Jhal, (B) Bir Sarkar-Name of Gram Panchyat- Jhal
19	Jharoda	
20	Jholri	
21	Juddi	
22	Kanharwas	
23	Karoli	
24	Kheri	 
25	Khurshid Nagar	
26	Koharar	
27	Kosli	
28	Lilodh	
29	Lukhi similar name Lookhi	
30	Lula Ahir	
31	Mumtajpur	
32	Mundra	
33	Nahar	
34	Nangal	
35	Nathera	
36	Naya Gaon	
36	Nehru Garh	
38	Rattanthal	
39	Shadat Nagar	
40	(A)Shadipur,(B)Bhuriawas-Name of Gram Panchyat-Shadipur
41	Sham Nagar	
42	Sudhrana	
43	Surakhpur Tappa Kosli	
44	Surheli	
45	Tumna	
46	Ushmapur
47     Rojgar Radar

See also
 Rewari

References

Villages in Rewari district